The Butler Downtown Historic District is a historic district in Butler, Georgia that was listed on the National Register of Historic Places in 2005.

It includes 46 contributing buildings, and also contributing are one site and two other structures (one a Conferate monument).

The Taylor County Courthouse (see accompanying photos #1, #2, #6, #9, and #14) is central in the district.  It was designed by Frederick Roy Duncan, was built in 1935, and was separately NRHP-listed in 1995.

The district has three historic gas stations (see photos #10, #11, and #12), which is unusual for a small town or any historic district.

The town's Masonic Lodge (1920; see photo #16) is a brick building with a parapet wall.  It has "limestone Art Deco
motifs at the corners and along the beltcourse."

On Ivey Street are two landmarks:
the Art Moderne-style building at Ivey & Main Streets (c.1940s), originally a car dealership (see photo #6), and
the Rabbit Box, historic hamburger joint, where John and Ruth Turk made "Turk Burgers" famous (see photo #3).

References

Historic districts on the National Register of Historic Places in Georgia (U.S. state)
Buildings and structures completed in 1852
Taylor County, Georgia
1852 establishments in Georgia (U.S. state)